Wade Farm is a historic home and farm complex located at Newark Valley in Tioga County, New York. The two story, side gabled frame house was constructed about 1822 in the Federal style.  Two smaller wings are attached; a one-story kitchen wing and a small wellhouse addition.  Also on the property are an English barn, secondary barn, granary, chicken house, milk house, and silo.

It was listed on the National Register of Historic Places in 1997.

References

Houses completed in 1822
Houses on the National Register of Historic Places in New York (state)
Federal architecture in New York (state)
Houses in Tioga County, New York
National Register of Historic Places in Tioga County, New York
1822 establishments in New York (state)